Sangin Station is a station of a city railroad of Daegu Metro Line 1 in Dalseo-gu Daegu, South Korea. It is located in Sangin crossroad. On April 28, 1995, there was an explosion with major damage. Sangin Station is one of the busiest stations outside downtown.

External links
 Cyber station information from Daegu Metropolitan Transit Corporation

Dalseo District
Railway stations opened in 1997
Daegu Metro stations